Maisin (or Maisan) is a language of Papua New Guinea with both Austronesian and Papuan features. The Austronesian elements are those of the Nuclear Papuan Tip languages. The Papuan element is Binanderean or Dagan. It is spoken by the Maisin people of Oro Province.

Maisin displays significant lexical copying from Korafe, a neighboring Papuan language.

Other languages with disputed affiliation between either Austronesian or Papuan are Magori, the Reefs-Santa Cruz languages, the Lower Mamberamo languages, and the Pasismanua languages.

Phonology

Vowels

Monophthongs

Diphthongs

Consonants

Phonotactics
Syllables can begin and end with up to one consonant each. I.e., English wrong  would be an acceptable word, but strength  would not.

Writing system

Literacy varies from 20% to 80% in different areas.

Morphosyntax

Negation

Negation in Maisin 
Negation in Maisin is achieved predominantly by morphology. The negation marking is discontinuous.

 is a morpheme located prior to the predicate of the sentence, and can be roughly glossed as 'not' in English. Morphologically, it is classified as a separate word.  is an enclitic that is found attached to a verb's tense- or aspect-marking enclitic. Alternatively, when there is no tense- or aspect-marking enclitic in the sentence, it attaches to the predicate's last item. Negation through  can be seen in the following examples.

In Example 1, the verb stem 'swim' takes both the progressive marker  (created through partial reduplication of the verb stem  and the negative enclitic , as well as the male second-person singular pronominal enclitic. The enclitic  attaches to the progressive marker .

Here negation is also shown through . In this case,  is attached directly to the end of the predicate, as there is no tense- or aspect-marking present. The first  in the sentence (in ) is not a negative marker; rather, it is a homophonous morpheme that functions as a topic marker.

In Example 3,  is found attached to the enclitic , which marks future tense.

Negation with  only 
In the presence of the conjunction  or the demonstrative , the  enclitic is removed, leaving  as the sole negation marker in the sentence.

The presence of the demonstrative morpheme  in the first clause of Example 4 displaces (and removes) . Thus,  is the sole negator of the clause.

This example shows the presence of the conjunction , which is attached to the end of the verb stem . This removes  and again leaves  as the only negation marker in the sentence.

Negation within Oceanic language family 
Maisin is an Oceanic language (Eberhard, Simons, & Fennig, 2019), and its negation system is fairly typical of Oceanic languages. Oceanic languages often express negation discontinuously, with the first element located preverbally and the second postverbally – Maisin fits this pattern, as the above examples demonstrate.

Additionally, Maisin follows both the Polynesian pattern of marking negation clause-initially and the Papuan pattern of marking negation clause-finally.

List of abbreviations 

 FUT = 'final' future enclitic
 LOC = locative enclitic
 NEG = negative enclitic
 PROG = progressive aspect
 TOP = topic marker enclitic

Notes 
The first interlinear text example was retrieved from page 50 of Maisin: A Preliminary Sketch by Malcolm Ross. The progressive marker is generated through reduplication, and so the glossing of each morpheme may be ambiguous - that is, it may not be entirely clear as to whether  should be glossed as 'PG' or 'swim', and likewise with the morpheme . This may explain why the first example seems to deviate from the typical pattern of negation.

See also
Magori language, a similar case

References

Sources

External links
Bada ari Foraga ari Buandi ari nane, ai Totoruga  Muanfafusi The Service of Holy Communion in  the Maisin Language (1921 translation digitized by Richard Mammana)
Maisin organised phonology data
Materials on Maisin are included in the open access Arthur Capell collections (AC1 and AC2) held by Paradisec
Paradisec also has a number of other collections in the Maisin language

Nuclear Papuan Tip languages
Languages of Milne Bay Province
Unclassified languages of New Guinea
Mixed languages